The Best of 1990–2000 is the second greatest hits album by Irish rock band U2. It was released on 5 November 2002 through Island Records and Interscope Records. It was issued as both a single-disc CD compilation and as a multi-disc compilation called The Best of 1990–2000 & B-Sides, which included a second disc of 14 B-sides released between 1990 and 2000 and a bonus DVD. A video album of the same name was later released in December 2002.

The Best of 1990–2000 contained two newly recorded tracks, "Electrical Storm" and "The Hands That Built America"; the former was released as a single, while the latter was released on the soundtrack to Gangs of New York. The compilation also includes "new mixes" of several songs, as well the tracks "Hold Me, Thrill Me, Kiss Me, Kill Me" (a non-album single from 1995) and "Miss Sarajevo" (which was originally credited to Passengers and also released as a single in 1995).

The album charted at number one in 13 countries and was the twelfth-best-selling album of 2002, according to the International Federation of the Phonographic Industry.

Track listing

"Electrical Storm" was released as a single in promotion of the album. "Gone," "Discothèque," "Staring at the Sun," and "Numb" were remixed by Mike Hedges for the compilation. "Mysterious Ways" is identical to the album version with the exception of a single lyric. "Miss Sarajevo," co-written by Brian Eno, was originally included on the album Original Soundtracks 1, which was released by the band under the alias "Passengers".

Limited Edition B-sides Disc

"North and South of the River" was written with Christy Moore. "Happiness Is a Warm Gun" was written by Lennon–McCartney. "Your Blue Room" was written with Brian Eno.

"The History Mix" is a video montage anthologizing the band's nineties albums and tours. It includes snippets of interviews, promotional videos, and so forth. The live version of "Please" is from the Helsinki Olympic Stadium in Helsinki, Finland, recorded on 9 August 1997 and directed by Maurice Linnane.

Charts

Weekly charts

Year-end charts

Decade-end charts

Certifications

Video

The Best of 1990–2000 was also released as a video compilation, featuring music videos from the songs on the album.  The DVD version of the video featured one to two videos for each song on the album, plus seven bonus videos (for songs not on the album), as well as directors' commentaries, and three mini-documentaries.  The VHS version of the video featured simply one video for the 16 songs from the album.

On all versions however, there is no video for "The First Time", as one was never made or rather released. In its place was put the video of "The Fly", which itself was on certain versions of the album. The DVD case had two disc slots, one for the main videos, the other for the "History Mix" DVD from the "A and B sides" version of the album. In its absence, a CD/DVD-shaped paper disc is used as a placeholder.

Track listing
Music and words by U2, except where otherwise noted.

"Even Better Than the Real Thing"
Kevin Godley video with commentary
Ritchie Smyth remix video
"Mysterious Ways"
Stéphane Sednaoui video with commentary
"Beautiful Day"
Jonas Åkerlund video with commentary
"Electrical Storm"
Anton Corbijn video with commentary
U2 Sur Mer documentary
"One"
Anton Corbijn video with commentary
Phil Joanou video with commentary
A Story of One documentary
"Miss Sarajevo"
Maurice Linnane video and commentary
Missing Sarajevo documentary
"Stay (Faraway, So Close!)"
Wim Wenders video and commentary
"Stuck in a Moment You Can't Get Out Of"
Joseph Kahn video with commentary
Kevin Godley video with commentary
"Gone"
David Mallet video (excerpt from PopMart: Live from Mexico City)
"Until the End of the World"
Kevin Godley video (live from Zoo TV Tour)
"The Hands That Built America"
Maurice Linnane studio version video
"Discothèque"
Stéphane Sednaoui video with commentary
"Hold Me, Thrill Me, Kiss Me, Kill Me"
Godley/Linanne video with commentary
"Staring at the Sun"
Jake Scott video with commentary
Morleigh Steinberg video
"Numb"
Kevin Godley video with commentary
Emergency Broadcast Network remix video
"The Fly"
Smith/Klein remix video with commentary

Bonus videos 
"Please"
Anton Corbijn video with commentary
"If God Will Send His Angels"
Phil Joanou video with commentary
"Who's Gonna Ride Your Wild Horses"
Phil Joanou video with commentary
"Lemon"
Mark Neale video with commentary
"Last Night on Earth"
Ritchie Smyth video with commentary
"Mofo"
Maurice Linnane remix video
"The Ground Beneath Her Feet"
Wim Wenders video with commentary

An "easter egg" also features. From the main menu on the DVD, if "One" is clicked, the main screen for "One" will appear. Once on this screen, the digit '1' could be clicked on the remote control three times. If clicked three times, a three-minute video of a fish tank, with fish swimming in it, appears. After some time, some Trabants will appear in the video as fishes, which swim from one end of the screen to the other.

All tracks were remastered for these releases.

Certifications

Personnel 
Credits adapted from liner notes.
Bono – lead vocals, guitar
The Edge – guitar, keyboards, vocals
Adam Clayton – bass guitar
Larry Mullen Jr. – drums and percussion

See also 
U2 discography

References

External links 
 The Best of 1990–2000 (standard edition) at U2 Wanderer, with comprehensive details on various editions, cover scans, lyrics, and more
 The Best of 1990–2000 (limited edition) at U2 Wanderer
 The Best of 1990–2000 (video) at U2 Wanderer

U2 compilation albums
B-side compilation albums
2002 greatest hits albums
U2 video albums
Island Records compilation albums
Island Records video albums
Albums produced by Daniel Lanois
Albums produced by Brian Eno
Albums produced by Steve Lillywhite
Albums produced by Flood (producer)
Albums produced by Steve Osborne
Albums produced by Howie B
Albums produced by the Edge
Albums produced by William Orbit
Albums produced by Nellee Hooper
Albums produced by Bono